Langelurillus krugeri is a jumping spider species in the genus Langelurillus that lives in South Africa. The female was first identified in 2013; the male has yet to be described.

References

Endemic fauna of South Africa
Salticidae
Spiders of South Africa
Spiders described in 2013
Taxa named by Wanda Wesołowska